The Man from the Diners' Club is a 1963 comedy film starring Danny Kaye and directed by Frank Tashlin. It was made by Ampersand and Dena Productions and released by Columbia Pictures.

Plot
Foots Pulardos is a mobster who intends to flee to Mexico with his moll Sugar Pye. In the meantime, he applies for a Diners Club charge card that is mistakenly approved by a meek clerk named Ernie Klenk, who is told to retrieve it from Foots.

Ernie arrives at Foots' gym that Foots uses as a front for his racketeering operations. Foots finds out that they share a unique physical similarity, which gives him an idea: he will burn down the gym, with Ernie in it, and change identities to fool the law.

Complications ensue, and the more involved that Ernie gets with Sugar, the more jealous his girlfriend Lucy becomes. And when Foots and Sugar head for the airport, Ernie must stop them.

Cast
 Danny Kaye as Ernest Klenk
 Cara Williams as Sugar Pye
 Martha Hyer as Lucy
 Telly Savalas as Foots Pulardos
 Everett Sloane as Martindale
 Kaye Stevens as Bea
 George Kennedy as George
 Ann Morgan Guilbert as Ella Trask
 Harry Dean Stanton as a Beatnik (uncredited)

Production
The film was produced by William Bloom from a screenplay by William Peter Blatty and John Fenton Murray. The music score was conducted by Stu Phillips and the cinematographer was Hal Mohr.

See also
List of American films of 1963
Diners Club International
Credit card fraud
Code 10

References

External links
 

1963 films
1960s English-language films
Columbia Pictures films
Films directed by Frank Tashlin
American black-and-white films
1963 comedy films
Films with screenplays by William Peter Blatty
American comedy films
Discover Financial
Films scored by Stu Phillips
1960s American films